Sisai Assembly constituency   is an assembly constituency in the Indian state of Jharkhand. It is a part of Lohardaga Lok Sabha constituency. Jiga Susaran Horo of JMM is the incumbent MLA.

Members of Assembly 
2005: Sameer Oraon, Bharatiya Janata Party
2009: Geeta Shree Oraon, Indian National Congress
2014: Dinesh Oraon, Bharatiya Janata Party
2019: Jiga Susaran Horo, JMM

Election Results

2019

See also
Vidhan Sabha
List of states of India by type of legislature

References

Assembly constituencies of Jharkhand
Gumla district